"What About Livingstone?" is a song by ABBA, released on their 1974 album Waterloo.

Synopsis
The song is about the 19th-century Scottish missionary and explorer David Livingstone. The Guardian described it as a song that "admonished Swedish youth for their disinterest in great explorers".

The song mentions Livingstone "travelling up the Nile". Livingstone made 4 great journeys into Africa, three of them starting in Cape Town, South Africa and the last at Zanzibar. None of the routes travelled on the Nile which lay far to the north. He may have crossed sections of the headwaters of Nile on his final expedition but he would not have known so as these areas were not considered to be in the Nile watershed until much later.

Composition
The vocals are provided by Agnetha and Frida. The song has a "catchy bass synth riff" in the chorus. An "innovative vocal countermelody" in these choruses marks the start of a "steady rise in complexity when it came to vocal arrangements".

Critical reception
The Guardian said the song had "weird lyrics". The Telegraph seems baffled that such a song exists, commenting "believe it or not, there’s an Abba song called What About Livingstone?". Bright Lights Dark Shadows: The Real Story of Abba says both songs "get by on their whimsical charm". Abba - Uncensored on the Record suggests What About Livingstone? and King Kong Song were novelty songs. It said What About Livingstone? was "catchy" and "nice", though adds that there is nothing special about it.

References

ABBA songs
1974 songs
Songs written by Benny Andersson and Björn Ulvaeus
Novelty songs
Songs about explorers
Cultural depictions of David Livingstone